Daniela Preiti (born ) is an Argentine female volleyball player.

She was part of the Argentina women's national volleyball team. 
On club level she played for GELP, ARG in 2003.

References

External links 
 Profile at FIVB.org

1972 births
Living people
Argentine women's volleyball players
Place of birth missing (living people)